Lake Helen or Helen Lake may refer to several places:

United States
 Helen Lake, Montana
 Lake Helen, Florida, a city in Florida
 Lake Helen (Portage County, Wisconsin)
 Lake Helen (Wyoming), a lake in the Big Horn Mountains
 Lake Helen (California), a lake in Northern California

Canada 
 Helen Lake (Vancouver Island)
 Lake Helen 53A - First Nations reserve in Ontario, located on the namesake Lake Helen

See also
 Helen (disambiguation)
 Lake St. Helen, Michigan